DAV Dudhichua is an Indian school situated in Dudhichua, Singrauli district, Madhya Pradesh. Approximately 5000 students are served by 51 teachers under the head Amitabh Shrivastava.
.

Location
The school is located in Dudhichua, Singrauli, Madhya Pradesh, India which is controlled by D A V MP Zone and managed by D.A.V. College Managing Committee

See also
DAV Public School Waidhan
D.A.V. College Managing Committee

References

External links

Schools in Singrauli district
Schools affiliated with the Arya Samaj
1987 establishments in Madhya Pradesh
Singrauli district
Schools in Madhya Pradesh